Taylor Field is a baseball stadium at 1201 East 16th Street in Pine Bluff, Arkansas. The stadium was built in 1939–40 with funding support from the Works Progress Administration and a design by local architect Mitchell Seligman. It was listed on National Register of Historic Places in 2010. The stadium played host until 1955 to minor league baseball teams, including the Pine Bluff Judges. Its grandstand has a capacity of about 1800, with another 600 in the bleachers.

See also
National Register of Historic Places listings in Jefferson County, Arkansas

References

Buildings and structures completed in 1939
Buildings and structures in Pine Bluff, Arkansas
National Register of Historic Places in Pine Bluff, Arkansas
Sports venues in Arkansas
Sports venues on the National Register of Historic Places in Arkansas
Sports in Pine Bluff, Arkansas